Kraljevci is a settlement in the Municipality of Sveti Jurij ob Ščavnici in northeastern Slovenia. It lies in the Slovene Hills on the road leading west out of Sveti Jurij towards Cerkvenjak. The area is part of the traditional region of Styria. It is now included in the Mura Statistical Region.

Davorin Trstenjak, a Slovene writer and historian, was born in the village in 1817. A commemorative plaque on a building in the village was unveiled in the early 20th century.

References

External links
Kraljevci at Geopedia

Populated places in the Municipality of Sveti Jurij ob Ščavnici